The 2019 Challenger Banque Nationale de Gatineau was a professional tennis tournament played on outdoor hard courts. It was the 4th edition of the tournament for men and the 6th for women, and it was part of the 2019 ATP Challenger Tour and the 2019 ITF Women's World Tennis Tour. It took place in Gatineau, Canada between July 15 and 21, 2019.

Men's singles main-draw entrants

Seeds

1 Rankings are as of July 1, 2019.

Other entrants
The following players received wildcards into the singles main draw:
 Liam Draxl
 Alexis Galarneau
 Brandon Holt
 Vasek Pospisil
 Benjamin Sigouin

The following player received entry into the singles main draw using a protected ranking:
  Carlos Gómez-Herrera

The following player received entry into the singles main draw as an alternate:
  Maximilian Neuchrist

The following players received entry into the singles main draw using their ITF World Tennis Ranking:
 Jordi Arconada
 Evan Hoyt
 Shintaro Imai
 Skander Mansouri
 Alejandro Tabilo

The following players received entry from the qualifying draw:
 Jacob Grills
 Dennis Novikov

The following player received entry as a lucky loser:
  Brydan Klein

Women's singles main-draw entrants

Seeds

1 Rankings are as of July 1, 2019.

Other entrants
The following players received wildcards into the singles main draw:
 Françoise Abanda
 Petra Januskova
 Layne Sleeth
 Carol Zhao

The following players received entry into the singles main draw using their ITF World Tennis Ranking:
 Dasha Ivanova
 Anna Morgina
 Madison Westby
 Marcela Zacarías
 Amy Zhu

The following players received entry from the qualifying draw:
 Carson Branstine
 Jada Bui
 Victoria Emma
 Haley Giavara
 Alexandra Perper
 Holly Verner

The following player received entry as a lucky loser:
 Alexandra Osborne

Champions

Men's singles

 Jason Kubler def.  Enzo Couacaud 6–4, 6–4.

Women's singles
 Leylah Annie Fernandez def.  Carson Branstine, 3–6, 6–1, 6–2

Men's doubles

 Alex Lawson /  Marc Polmans def.  Hans Hach Verdugo /  Dennis Novikov 6–4, 3–6, [10–7].

Women's doubles
 Leylah Annie Fernandez /  Rebecca Marino def.  Hsu Chieh-yu /  Marcela Zacarías, 7–6(7–5), 6–3

References

External links
Official website 

2019 ATP Challenger Tour
2019 ITF Women's World Tennis Tour
2019
2019 in Canadian sports
July 2019 sports events in Canada